Automotive Corridor (also known as Detroit of Asia), is a 60 km long corridor in Chennai, India. This corridor alone accounts for 33% of commercial vehicles, 21% of all passenger cars, and 35% of auto components which are produced in the country.  The corridor stretches from Gummidipoondi, 50 km north of Chennai to Maraimalai Nagar 35 km south of Chennai and passes through Tiruvallur, Sriperumbudur and Oragadam. It is estimated that a part of this corridor from Tiruvallur to Maraimalai Nagar alone, by 2012, would produce around 1.25 million cars, 35,000 commercial vehicles and other automotives per year.

Detroit of Asia
A number of big motor companies has presence along the Automotive Corridor which includes BMW, Ford, Hyundai, Renault-Nissan, Mitsubishi, Caparo Group, Komatsu, Caterpillar, Ashok Leyland, TVS, and others. Oragadam is regarded as the epicenter of this corridor which boasts of the National Automobile Testing and R&D Infrastructure Project (NATRIP). This corridor is served by three major ports—Chennai Port, Kattupalli Shipyard and Ennore Port.

Tyre hub of India
Major tyre manufacturing companies alone have committed investments around $4 billion in Tamil Nadu of which 90% has been invested in the Automotive Corridor. A number of tyre manufacturing companies have set up factories in this corridor and are as follows.

See also
 Automobile industry in Chennai
 Rajiv Gandhi Salai
 Electronics Corridor
 SEZ Corridor

References

High-technology business districts in Chennai
Automotive industry in India